Jonathan Witchell (20 September 1974 – 15 December 2007) was a BBC reporter who worked for Radio Kent from 1998 until his death. He was a two time Shepherd Neame Kent Journalist of the Year, in 2004 and 2006.

He was born and raised in Sevenoaks in Kent and studied at the University of Salford for his bachelor's degree and University of Stirling for his master's degree. He died in 2007 after a short illness.

References

External links
  BBC Radio Kent tribute to Jonathan Witchell

BBC newsreaders and journalists
British radio people
People from Sevenoaks
Alumni of the University of Salford
Alumni of the University of Stirling
1974 births
2007 deaths